Rubus wisconsinensis is a North American species of bristleberry in section Setosi of the genus Rubus, a member of the rose family. It is native to the north-central United States (Minnesota, Wisconsin, Michigan, Iowa, Illinois).

References

wisconsinensis
Endemic flora of the United States
Flora of Wisconsin
Flora of Michigan
Flora of Minnesota
Flora of Iowa
Flora of Illinois
Plants described in 1932
Flora without expected TNC conservation status